Gundiah Railway Station is a closed railway station on the North Coast railway line in Queensland, Australia. In 1922, a goods train derailed at the railway station.

1922 Derailment
On Friday 24 November 1922, a train carrying goods derailed while shunting at Gundiah. The brake van fell across the North Coast line, making Gundiah impassable for many days. Several wagons of goods were also derailed. At about 7pm, the driver of the train was moving the entire consist forward, however, the train failed to move up the grade. The driver reversed to make another attempt at the grade, however "part of the train ran back onto the main line, and part onto the siding at Gundiah Station". Nobody was injured.

References

Disused railway stations in Queensland
North Coast railway line, Queensland